Railways of Burma may refer to:

Burma Railway - a railway connecting Thailand and Burma constructed by the Japanese using POW labor during World War II
Rail transport in Burma
History of rail transport in Myanmar
for Burma Railway Company, an early British era company charged with operating the railways of Burma, see History of rail transport in Myanmar
for government run railroads see Myanmar Railways